Terrence Philip Julian Forrestal (13 May 1948 – 10 June 2000) was an English actor, stuntman and BASE jumper.

Born in Chesterfield, Derbyshire, to 
Irish parents, he attended Finchley Catholic Grammar School. He served in the British Armed Forces in Northern Ireland, among other places.

He was a stuntman and stunt coordinator since the 1970s. He was also a technical advisor and occasionally an actor on films and TV. His best-known work includes Bond films Moonraker, Octopussy, Never Say Never Again, and GoldenEye, as well as Indiana Jones and the Temple of Doom, Batman (1989), Robin Hood: Prince of Thieves, Braveheart, Titanic and Elizabeth.

He died in a BASE jumping accident on 10 June 2000, in Lysefjord, Norway, aged 52.

Filmography

References

External links
 

1948 births
2000 deaths
English male film actors
English male television actors
English stunt performers
People from Chesterfield, Derbyshire
Special Air Service soldiers
Accidental deaths in Norway
BASE jumping deaths
20th-century English male actors
People educated at Finchley Grammar School
English people of Irish descent